Buddha Priya Maurya (1 May  1926 – 27 September 2004), better known as B.P. Maurya, was a popular Indian politician and a member of the 3rd Lok Sabha and 5th Lok Sabha of western Uttar Pradesh. He was elected to the Lok Sabha, lower house of the Parliament of India from Hapur, Uttar Pradesh in the 1971 Indian general election as a member of the Indian National Congress, defeating senior Prakash Vir Shastri leader Bharatiya Kranti Dal.

Early life 

Maurya was born on 1 May 1926 in the town of Khair in Uttar Pradesh. His family was of Rajasthani background from the town of Bharatpur. Maurya was born into Jatav (Dalit) caste, who were treated as untouchables and subjected to socio-economic discrimination. Although, He attended school very late at age of 8 years. He used to graze animals in his childhood. His father took him to get admission in primary school at the age of 8, but the headmaster of the school refused to admit the child because of the child’s age. His father gave a silver coin to the headmaster as a bribe. Maurya got admission but was not allowed to sit inside the class with other general caste students with same mat. He had to carry a sitting mat with him. When he needed to drink water, someone from a higher caste had to pour that water from a height as they were not allowed to touch pitcher.

His childhood days were spent in extreme poverty. When an animal died in the village,  the children used to collect and store the fat of the animal. There was no mustard or kerosene oil to light the lamps in the houses. The lamps were used to burn in the house with the fat of the dead animals. He studies in the light of whose lamps.  Maurya was a very brilliant mind and within a few years, he was in the ranks of meritorious students. He started getting merit scholarships from class 4 onwards. Maurya continued his studies with daliy wages and passed High School in 1946 from Vaishya High School (Khair).

References

1926 births
2004 deaths
Indian National Congress politicians
Republican Party of India politicians
Lok Dal politicians
India MPs 1962–1967
India MPs 1971–1977
Lok Sabha members from Uttar Pradesh
Indian Buddhists
20th-century Buddhists
21st-century Buddhists
Scheduled Castes Federation politician
Indian National Congress politicians from Madhya Pradesh